Power Broker is the name of two fictional characters appearing in American comic books published by Marvel Comics. The "Power Broker" concept was devised by Mark Gruenwald as a satire on the public obsession with health and fitness.

Publication history
The Curtiss Jackson version of Power Broker first appeared in Machine Man #6 (September 1978) and was created by Roger Stern and Sal Buscema.

The second version of Power Broker first appeared in Avengers: The Initiative Annual #1 (January 2008) and was created by Dan Slott and Christos N. Gage.

Fictional character biography

Curtiss Jackson

Curtiss Jackson was born in Charlotte, North Carolina. He became a professional criminal and an executive with the criminal organization known as the Corporation. As a member of the Corporation, Jackson attempts to take control of Machine Man. With Eugene Stivak, Moonstone, and the Vamp, he later battles Captain America, Marvel Man, the Falcon, and the Hulk. Jackson kidnaps Trish Starr, and battles the Hulk and Machine Man again.

Jackson founds the Power Broker Corporation. He hires Dr. Karl Malus, a mad scientist who has experimented on various superhuman individuals, to technologically augment the strength of paying customers to superhuman levels. The strength augmenting process is tremendously risky, with half the subjects dying or becoming severely deformed, but this information is kept a closely guarded secret. Power Broker and Malus use highly addictive drugs on their subjects, telling them that the chemical is necessary to stabilize their powers, but in fact it only serves to keep the subjects working for—and paying—the Power Broker. Many wrestlers of the Unlimited Class Wrestling Federation, which is only open to those with super-strength, use the Power Broker's services, and wind up indebted to them.

The Power Broker offers Sharon Ventura superhuman strength. She is reportedly sexually abused while drugged. She breaks free before Malus can administer the addictive drug, so the Power Broker sends the Grapplers to kill her. The Power Broker later kidnaps Demolition-Man, and battles Captain America and the Shroud when they come to rescue him.

When Power Broker, Inc. is attacked by the Scourge of the Underworld, Curtiss Jackson exposes himself to his own augmentation device. The process goes awry, leaving him so grotesquely muscle-bound that he cannot move. Jackson was revealed to be a patient at Los Angeles County Hospital. Malus decided to take advantage of this situation by sending Vagabond, who knew Jackson (having previously approached him about gaining super-strength herself), to obtain a copy of his fingerprints so that Malus could access all of Jackson's personal accounts and vaults. He used an explosive wristband to force Vagabond's cooperation, but she managed to knock Malus out, destroy the fingerprint mold, place the band on his wrist, and inject him with the drug he had planned to use on her.

The Power Broker had Malus' legs broken for his betrayal, then promptly re-hired him to try to cure Jackson's condition. Malus captured and experimented on several augmented individuals, including Battlestar to perfect the de-augmentation process, which drew the involvement of the U.S. Agent. Jackson appeared, revealed to be using an exo-skeleton to move. Together, Battlestar and the Agent defeated Jackson and freed the captured wrestlers, and forced Malus to restore their strength. The U.S. Agent then destroyed Malus' equipment and records, leaving Jackson in an over-augmented state.

Power Broker has been responsible for providing augmented henchmen to various criminal organizations, such as the Sweatshop, and the Power Tools.

The Power Broker was later revealed as one of the Red Skull's division chiefs.

Jackson resurfaced following the Maximum Security storyline, when Earth was made into an intergalactic penal colony. His extra-muscular bulk had been shed in-between appearances leaving him looking normal once again. Seeing an opportunity to recruit many of the exotic prisoners being dumped by the Kree and other alien races, Jackson raced to an area his computers determined would have a large amount of arrivals. Unfortunately for Jackson, the aliens were less than pleased at having been dumped on Earth, and attacked him. Playing dead, Jackson came upon a parasitic organism (Jackson calls it an alien, but U.S. Agent believed it to be an escaped S.H.I.E.L.D. experiment to control the alien criminals) who had lost its host. In exchange for becoming its host, Jackson would be granted the use of the parasite's spawn to infect and control others. In his plan to take over the world, Jackson smuggled the parasite spawns to a HYDRA base and a rebel Atlantean group. These operations were broken up by S.T.A.R.S. (Superhuman Tactical Activities Response Squad) and their main agent, U.S. Agent, leading the group to take down the Power Broker once again.

The Punisher later kills and impersonates Jackson in order to infiltrate a supervillain auction being held on Long Island.

Second version
Very little is known about the second version of the Power Broker other than he wears a battle suit and can project bolts of energy from his hands. This new Power Broker has apparently taken over Power Broker, Inc. He was responsible for giving Paul Brokeridge super-strength to wrestle in the Unlimited Class Wrestling Federation, a move that led to Paul attaining the championship and later being crippled by a stronger wrestler. Power Broker was also responsible for giving Paul's brother Roger superpowers where Roger later became the superhero Hardball.

Power Broker proceeds to invest in Hench, a mobile app that allows people to quickly hire supervillains. He demonstrates his invention to Darren Cross by enlisting Whirlwind to kill Ant-Man. When Cross refuses to invest at least 1.2 billion dollars in Hench, Power Broker ends the demo, and cancels Whirlwind's attempted assassination of Ant-Man. A publicist named Marlena Howard later uses Hench to hire the Magician's son to stage an attack on Darla Deering.

Cross's unwillingness to invest in the Hench App spurs Augustine Cross into hiring Machinesmith to hack into the databases of Power Broker Inc. so that Cross Technological Enterprises can steal the Hench algorithm and use it to create a knock-off called "Lackey." During a meeting with Slug, who had used Hench to hire the new Hijacker to steal a Giganto egg, Power Broker is made aware of Cross's treachery, which enrages him to the point of ordering the premature release of "Hench 2.0".

Power Broker later held an event to promote the new Hench 2.0 upgrade. In order to protect the unveiling, he used the Hench App to hire a female Blacklash.

Cassandra Lang attempts to get abilities from Power Broker with the intention of double-crossing him. However, Power Broker realizes that she does not have what it takes to be a villain. Instead, Power Broker tells her about Darren having stolen her heart and that her father hid it from her. As Darren had stolen something from him, he makes a deal with her....he will give her powers to do with as she wants. In exchange, she must retrieve the item that Darren took from him and in the process get her revenge on him. She chooses to have her old powers back because she does not want to learn a new power set. Lang is given a new suit and a helmet similar to her father's while sporting the new name of Stinger.

At a public event, Power Broker revealed the Hench X app that enables anyone to become a supervillain. He tests it out on a former comic store clerk named Paul who ends up becoming the second Plantman. Plantman was then unleashed when Ant-Man showed up to interrogate Power Broker on personal matters.

Some time later, Power Broker ran out of funding for his Hench app and fled to his secret island where he started to work on an app for supervillain travel booking. Unfortunately, his investors turned down the idea. Upon tracking down Power Broker, Stinger subdued him.

Powers and abilities
The Curtiss Jackson version of Power Broker was an ordinary man until he exposed himself to his own chemical and radiation strength augmentation process. This granted him superhuman strength and durability, but left him with a grotesquely overdeveloped muscular physique which renders him unable to move without artificial aids. Dr. Karl Malus invented a powerful steel alloy exo-skeleton with tongue controls and flight capabilities to enable the Power Broker to move. Jackson has managed to de-augment himself and no longer uses the exo-skeleton. Jackson was briefly the host to a parasitic organism. This allowed him to mind-control anyone infected with the organism's spawn. Jackson has a college degree in business administration, and is a highly skilled administrator and planner.

The second Power Broker wears a battlesuit and can project bolts of energy from his hands.

Power Broker Inc.
Power Broker, Inc. is a fictional criminal corporation in the Marvel Universe which provides individuals with superhuman physical abilities for a price. The organization was created by Mike Carlin and Paul Neary.

Fictional organization history
Power Broker Inc. was founded by Curtiss Jackson and Karl Malus. Power Broker Inc. specializes in augmenting the strengths of anyone at a superhuman level. When Curtiss was killed by the Punisher, the second Power Broker took over.

In other media
Sharon Carter (portrayed by Emily VanCamp) uses the "Power Broker" as an alias in the live-action miniseries The Falcon and the Winter Soldier. The Power Broker serves as the judge, jury and executioner on Madripoor. In the episode "The Star-Spangled Man", the Flag Smashers steal a shipment from her, so she sends hired men after them. In the episode "Power Broker", it is revealed that she hired former Hydra scientist Dr. Wilfred Nagel following the Blip to recreate the Super Soldier Serum, which the Flag Smashers stole and used to empower themselves. Her status is revealed in the series finale "One World, One People", during which she kills the Flag Smashers' leader Karli Morgenthau, rejoins the CIA after being pardoned, and contacts a mysterious individual to tell them she has access to the government's resources.

References

External links
 Power Broker (disambiguation) at Marvel.com
 Power Broker I at Marvel.com
 Power Broker I at Marvel Wiki
 Power Broker II at Marvel Wiki
 Power Broker Inc. at Marvel Wiki
 Power Broker I at Comic Vine
 Power Broker II at Comic Vine

Characters created by Christos Gage
Characters created by Dan Slott
Characters created by Jack Kirby
Comics characters introduced in 1978
Comics characters introduced in 2008
Fictional characters from North Carolina
Fictional companies
Fictional organizations in Marvel Comics
Marvel Comics supervillains